Below are the squads for the 1962 FIFA World Cup final tournament in Chile. Switzerland (3), England (1), Spain (1) and West Germany (1) had players representing foreign clubs.

Two selected players comes from a foreign club of a non-qualified country (France).

Group 1

Soviet Union
Head coach: Gavril Kachalin

Yugoslavia
Head coaches: Ljubomir Lovrić and Prvoslav Mihajlović

Uruguay
Head coach: Juan Carlos Corazzo

Colombia
Head coach:  Adolfo Pedernera

Group 2

West Germany
Head coach: Sepp Herberger

Chile
Head coach: Fernando Riera

Italy
Head coach: Giovanni Ferrari and Paolo Mazza

Switzerland
Head coach:  Karl Rappan

Group 3

Brazil
Head coach: Aymoré Moreira

Czechoslovakia
Head coach: Rudolf Vytlačil

Mexico
Head coach: Ignacio Tréllez

Spain
Head coach:  Helenio Herrera

Group 4

Hungary
Head coach: Lajos Baróti

England
Head coach: Walter Winterbottom

Derek Kevan was a stay-at-home reserve. Jimmy Adamson, officially part of the squad, acted as assistant manager. The squad list at FIFA's website lists Gordon Banks instead of Adamson; according to another source, Banks was intended to be a stay-at-home reserve too but was eventually omitted from the list.

Argentina
Head coach: Juan Carlos Lorenzo

Bulgaria
Head coach: Georgi Pachedzhiev

Notes
Each national team had to submit a squad of 22 players. All the teams included 3 goalkeepers, except Uruguay, Colombia, Brazil, England and Argentina who only called two.

References

 weltfussball.de 

FIFA World Cup squads
Squads